Rene-Guy Charles Okala (19 October 1910 – 16 September  1973) was a Cameroonian politician.

Biography
Born in Bilomo in the Centre Region in 1910, Okala attended a Catholic primary school in Yaoundé.

Following World War II, he was elected to the local Assembly, and became a member of the French Senate in 1947, serving until 1955. In 1959 he established the Socialist Party of Cameroon (PSC), which contested the 1960 elections as part of the Group of Cameroonian Progressives.

In 1960 he was appointed independent Cameroon's first Foreign Minister. However, he was sacked in 1961 and arrested in June 1962, after which he was tried and convicted for conspiracy. He was released from prison in 1965 as part of a deal that involved the dissolution of the PSC, and joined the Cameroonian Union and its successor the Cameroon National Union.

Despite being appointed a roving ambassador by President Ahmadou Ahidjo in 1968, he later fell out of favour. He died in Paris in 1973.

References

French Senators of the Fourth Republic
1910 births
1973 deaths
Senators of French Equatorial Africa
Foreign ministers of Cameroon
People from Centre Region (Cameroon)
20th-century Cameroonian politicians